Pro-Wrestling: EVE (EVE) is a British independent women's professional wrestling promotion founded in 2010 and run by Dann and Emily Read. The promotion runs out of various venues in London, and also promotes events in theatres and town halls. It incorporates feminism, punk rock, and professional wrestling. It held the first all-female professional wrestling event to take place in London in March 2016.

Spirit of EVE rules
Unless otherwise stipulated, EVE wrestling matches are conducted under a set of rules known as the Spirit of EVE. Wrestlers are given significant leeway, so long as all competitors in the match are consenting. Low blows and foreign objects are not automatically grounds for disqualification, and there are no count-outs. Disqualification may still occur in the event of outside interference, attacking the referee, or disobeying the referee's instructions.

Under the Spirit of EVE rules, matches are won by:
Pinning the opponent's shoulders for the referee's count of 3
Making the opponent submit, either verbally or by tap out
Referee stoppage
Disqualification

History
Pro-Wrestling: EVE was originally developed in 2010 by married couple Dann and Emily Read due to their desire to showcase women's professional wrestling. They also wanted to provide positive female role models for their daughter. Emily describes the promotion as a "feminist, grassroots promotion," as well as punk. In 2012, Pro-Wrestling: EVE was included in Vice magazine's documentary The British Wrestler.

The promotion was put on hold in 2012 while Emily was hospitalized due to suicidal inclinations under the Mental Health Act. She was later released from the hospital with a diagnosis of bipolar disorder. The Reads were able to re-open the promotion and had their first event since the hiatus in March 2016. It was the first all-female professional wrestling event to take place in London.

In 2017, both women's wrestling and British professional wrestling in general enjoyed a growth in popularity internationally. The promotion broadcasts shows on internet pay-per-view (iPPV).

On 1 February 2020, Emersyn Jayne (then known as Sammii Jayne) became the first-ever Triple Crown winner in the promotion's history, winning the Pro-Wrestling: EVE International Championship after defeating Jamie Hayter in a four-way match. Jayne was previously an EVE champion and then a Tag Team champion.

Wrestle Queendom
On 5 May 2018, Pro-Wrestling: EVE held their biggest show yet, Wrestle Queendom. Not only was this the first all-women wrestling show to be held at the York Hall, it was the biggest all-women wrestling show in the United Kingdom's history.

Results

Current champions

Roster

Current

 Addy Starr
 Alex Windsor
 Charli Evans
 Chihiro Hashimoto
 Dash Chisako
 Emersyn Jayne
 Erin Angel
 Jetta
 Kasey Owens
 Laura Di Matteo
 Leah Owens
 Livvii Grace
 Martina
 Rhia O'Reilly
 Yuu
 Zoe Lucas

Alumni

 Alpha Female
 Angelina Love
 Blue Nikita
 Britani Knight
 Carmel Jacob
 Charlie Morgan 
 Debbie Keitel
 Emi Sakura
 Courtney
 Hannah Blossom
 Holly Blossom
 Jamie Hayter
 Jenny Sjödin
 Kay Lee Ray
 Kris Wolf
 Manami Toyota
 Meiko Satomura
 Millie McKenzie
 Nikki Storm
 Nixon Newell
 Nina Samuels
 Pollyanna
 Riho
 Sadie Gibbs
 Utami Hayashishita
 Valkyrie
 Viper

Hall of Fame

References

External links

British professional wrestling promotions
Women's professional wrestling promotions
British companies established in 2010